ROV PHOCA is a remotely operated underwater vehicle of the COMANCHE type. It was built by sub-Atlantic, Aberdeen, Scotland and is owned by the GEOMAR - Helmholtz Centre for Ocean Research Kiel. Its smaller size compared to the ROV KIEL 6000 and therefore its deploy ability from medium-sized research vessels makes it a complement to the QUEST type ROV. It can dive up to 3000m (9842.52 feet) and was designed as a Work-Class- and Intervention-ROV.

It is characterized by these features:

 2 manipulators facilitate different sampling procedures
 Digital video cameras on pan-&-tilt units are used as survey and mapping devices
 It is fitted with the following auto-functions: depth, heading and altitude
 The digital telemetry system SubCanTM provides real time data transmission
 A payload of up to 100 kg allows the integration of different additional scientific equipment
 ROV PHOCA is deployed in the so-called live-boating mode, i.e. it is directly connected to the respective vessel via a steel armoured optical fiber cable

ROV PHOCA's main employment will be the installation and maintenance of the deep sea observatory MoLab, but also within other multi-disciplinary projects such as projects by the Cluster of Excellence "The Future Ocean".

Technical specifications

References

External links
 Website GEOMAR
 Website "The Future Ocean"

Remotely operated underwater vehicles
Robotic submarines